Hyposensitivity, also known as Sensory under-responsitivity, refers to abnormally decreased sensitivity to sensory input.

Hyposensitivity is especially common in people with Autism, and is mostly seen in children. Those experiencing this have a harder time stimulating their senses than normally. They may not feel pain as easily as others, may be drawn to loud noises, be attracted to bright lights and colours, among other things.

Hyposensitivity can lead to an inactivated brain. This can give concentration problems, feeling drained or feckless, depression, procrastination and also hypersensitivities.

Types of hyposensitivity

Auditory hyposensitivity symptoms include:
 Little or no vocalizing/babbling as an infant.
 Speaks in a loud voice and/or excessively.
 Likes excessively loud music, games, TV.
 Difficulty with verbal cues of to name being called.
 Difficulty understanding or remembering what was said.
 Needs instructions repeated, or will say "what?" frequently.
 Talks self through task, often out loud.
 Appears oblivious to certain sounds
 Disorientation/confusion about where a sound is coming from.

Tactile hyposensitivity symptoms include:
 Craves touch. Needs to touch everything and everyone.
 Self-abusive; pinching, biting, cutting, head-banging.
 Has a high pain tolerance.
 Likes to put objects in their mouth.
 Seeks out surfaces and textures that provide strong tactile feedback.
 Often is not aware of being touched/bumped unless done with extreme force or sensitivity.
 Often injures self; burns, cuts, bruises, because harmful acts do not register as easily.
 May not be aware that hands or face are dirty.

Olfactory hyposensitivity symptoms include:
 Fails to notice or ignores noxious odors.
 Excessively smells new objects, toys, people.
 May drink or eat things that are harmful/poisonous because they do not notice the noxious smell.
 
Taste hyposensitivity symptoms include:
 May eat inedible objects such as dirt, chalk, crayons.
 Prefers food with intense flavour - excessively spicy, sweet, sour, or salty.
 Frequently chews hair, shirt, fingers.
 Likes to put objects in their mouth.
 Often puts objects in mouth, even past the toddler years.
 Likes brushing teeth/vibrating toothbrushes, and even trips to the dentist.

Visual hyposensitivity symptoms include:
 Complains about "seeing double."
 Fatigues easily with reading, writing, drawing, playing video games

Vestibular hyposensitivity symptoms include:

 Likes to move a lot.
 Rock back and forth or walks in circles while body rocking.
 Can spin or swing for a long time without feeling dizzy or nauseated.
 Difficulty standing still in one position.

Proprioceptive hyposensitivity symptoms include:

 Unaware of body sensations. For example not feeling hunger.
 Difficulty knowing where the body is in space.
 Bumping into objects and people, tendency to fall.
 Weak grasp and can frequently drop things. 
 Leaning against people, furniture or walls.

References

Cutaneous conditions